Tofino Harbour Water Aerodrome  is located in Tofino Harbour adjacent to Tofino, British Columbia, Canada.

Airlines and destinations

See also
 List of airports on Vancouver Island

References

Seaplane bases in British Columbia
Clayoquot Sound region
Registered aerodromes in British Columbia